The University of Kentucky College of Public Health is a school of public health at the University of Kentucky in Lexington, Kentucky, United States.

History
The University of Kentucky College of Public Health was founded in 2004. Its programs are accredited by the Council on Education for Public Health (CEPH) and the Commission on Accreditation of Healthcare Management Education (CAHME).

Degree programs
 Bachelor of Public Health (BPH)
 Master of Public Health (MPH) in six concentration areas: biostatistics, environmental health, epidemiology, gerontology, health behavior, and health services management
 Doctor of Public Health (DrPH) in four areas: epidemiology, gerontology, health behavior, and health services management
 Doctor of Philosophy (PhD) in gerontology
 Doctor of Philosophy (PhD) in epidemiology/biostatistics
 Dual degree programs: MD/MPH, PharmD/MPH, JD/MHA

Research and outreach 
Professors and at the college provide research for programs such as Kentucky Health Access Nurturing Development Services (HANDS), a home visitation program for high-risk parents, who are primarily young and low income, that has been praised by Rep. Kimberly Moser and Sen. Reginald Thomas. Professor Corrine Williams serves as the evaluator for the program.

References

Public Health
Schools of public health in the United States
Educational institutions established in 2004
2004 establishments in Kentucky
Medical and health organizations based in Kentucky